"Theme for Young Lovers" is an instrumental by British group the Shadows, released as a single in February 1964. It peaked at number 12 on the UK Singles Chart.

Release and reception
Despeite being written by the Shadows' Bruce Welch, he does not actually feature on the recording as he was not in the studio during the recording session. Instead, his part, the acoustic rhythm guitar, was played by Hank Marvin. It was also the last Shadows recording to feature bassist Brian Locking, who left the group before the release of their previous single "Geronimo", being replaced by John Rostill. It was the lead single from the film Wonderful Life, featuring Cliff Richard, and was included on the soundtrack album by Richard and the Shadows. The B-side "This Hammer" is a traditional song, originally titled "Take This Hammer" and was arranged by the Shadows.

Reviewed in Record Mirror, "Theme for Young Lovers" was described as an "easy on the ear treatment of a number from the film "Wonderful Life". It's a delicate sounding slower-than-usual number which should give them a pretty big hit once more". For Disc, Don Nicholl wrote that "at first hearing, the line appears simple enough with roots, perhaps, in an old Scottish folk item. But I find it takes a few spins before you're able to remember it properly. It's a soothing guitar special".

Track listing
7": Columbia / DB 7231
 "Theme for Young Lovers" – 2:38
 "This Hammer" – 2:68

7": Atlantic / 45-2235 (US)
 "Theme for Young Lovers" – 2:41
 "The Rise and Fall of Flingel Bunt" – 2:42

Personnel
 Hank Marvin – electric lead guitar, acoustic rhythm guitar
 Brian "Licorice" Locking – electric bass guitar
 Brian Bennett – drums, tom-toms

Charts

References 

1964 singles
1964 songs
The Shadows songs
Columbia Graphophone Company singles
Rock instrumentals
Songs written by Bruce Welch
1960s instrumentals
Percy Faith songs